Kuibisia glabra is a sac-like and polyp-like solitary Ediacaran organism. The fossil of Kuibisia was dated to be around 610–640 million years old and was found in a pteridinium deposit at Aar Farm in Namibia, South Africa.

Taxonomy 
The name “Kuibisia” comes from the Kuibis quartzite, derived from Kuibis in Nimbia, where the Ausiidae occur. “Glabra” comes from the Latin word meaning “smooth”, after the organism’s surface.

Morphology, anatomy, & behavior 
Kuibisia glabra is built like a conical shaped polyp, about 10 cm long and 3.5 cm at its widest point. It has a sack-like central region, and slender basal core. The organism lived as a single and solitary polyp. The apical “mouth” is densely covered by a wreath of tentacles and develop from coaxial ribs that cover the surface of the organism. The fossil is dated to be 610–640 million years old.

Distribution & paleoenvironment 
Found in a pteridinium deposit of overlying black limestone, the specimen was found in the Aus locality at Aar Farm in Namibia, South Africa

Other notable characteristics 
Kuibisia is ecologically similar to other polyp shaped organisms, the Ceriantharia and the Actiniaria. Kuibisia resembles the sessile Ceriantharia in some features, but this does not mean that there is a relationship between them. Hahn and Pflug placed the genera Ausia and Kuibisia with the family Ausiidae and interpreted them as an early branch of Coelenterata.

See also 
 List of Ediacaran genera
 Cnidaria

References

Ediacaran life
Cnidarians